Giovanni Paolo Lolmo (c. 1550–1593) was an Italian painter of the late-Renaissance period, active mainly in his native city of Bergamo. He is also known as Gian Paolo Lolmo. In 1587, he painted Saint Rocco and Sebastian for Santa Maria Maggiore (Bergamo).

References

 Storia dell pittura Italian esposta coi monumenti, Volume 6, Epoca Quarta dai Caracci all'Appiani Tomo VI. by Giovanni Rosini, Presso Niccolo Capurro, 1846, Pisa.

1593 deaths
16th-century Italian painters
Italian male painters
Painters from Bergamo
Renaissance painters
Year of birth uncertain